Oberea gracilis is a species of beetle in the family Cerambycidae. It was described by Johan Christian Fabricius in 1801, originally under the genus Saperda. It is known from North America.

References

gracilis
Beetles described in 1801